Constantin Giurescu may refer to:

 Constantin Giurescu (historian) (1875–1918), Romanian historian, titular member of the Romanian Academy
 Constantin C. Giurescu (1901–1977), Romanian historian, member of the Romanian Academy, and professor at the University of Bucharest
 Constantin Giurescu (football manager) (born 1981), Romanian football manager